Mount Lozen is a mountain,  high, at the northwest side of the head of Tocci Glacier in the Admiralty Mountains of Antarctica. It was mapped by the United States Geological Survey from surveys and U.S. Navy air photos, 1960–64, and was named by the Advisory Committee on Antarctic Names for Michael R. Lozen, U.S. Navy, a radioman at McMurdo Station, 1967.

References

Mountains of Victoria Land
Borchgrevink Coast